Cybister ventralis, is a species of predaceous diving beetle found in India, Bangladesh, Myanmar, Pakistan, Sri Lanka and China.

Adult beetles are edible and consumed in fried form.

References 

Dytiscidae
Insects of Sri Lanka
Insects described in 1882